The Sumgayit FK 2015-16 season is Sumgayit's fifth Azerbaijan Premier League season, and sixth season in their history. They will participate in the Azerbaijan Cup as well as the League.

Season events
On 8 October 2015, Agil Mammadov resigned as manager, being replaced by reserve team manager Samir Abbasov. On 11 January 2016, Mammadov was re-hired as manager.

Squad

Out on loan

Transfers

Summer

In:

Out:

Winter

In:

Out:

Friendlies

Competitions

Azerbaijan Premier League

Results summary

Results

League table

Azerbaijan Cup

Squad statistics

Appearances and goals

|-
|colspan="14"|Players who appeared for Sumgayit but left during the season:

|}

Goal scorers

Disciplinary record

Notes
Qarabağ have played their home games at the Tofiq Bahramov Stadium since 1993 due to the ongoing situation in Quzanlı.

References

Azerbaijani football clubs 2015–16 season
Sumgayit FK seasons